La Pitié is a chapel in the commune of Mellionnec in the Côtes-d'Armor department in Brittany in north-western France. It is on the shore of Canal de Nantes à Brest between locks 146 and 147.

Photos
 Chapelle N-D de Pitié (Mellionnec)
 Mellionnec - La Pitié
 Le canal de Nantes à Brest à Mellionnec
 Ecluse 147 Restouel été 2006
 Ecluse 146 Coatnatous été 2006

See also
 Pitié-Salpêtrière Hospital
 La Pitié suprême

References

Churches in Côtes-d'Armor